Jason X. Williams (born April 23, 1986) is a former American football linebacker who played in the National Football League (NFL) for the Dallas Cowboys, Carolina Panthers, Philadelphia Eagles and Tampa Bay Buccaneers. He played college football at Western Illinois.

Early years
Williams was born in Chicago, Illinois and attended DuSable High School. As a senior, he contributed to his team's undefeated record in the Chicago Public League’s Intra-City Central Conference. 

He rushed for 2,988 yards, threw for 3,015 yards and recorded 71 total touchdowns (35 rushing and 36 passing) in his career. He was a two-time All-City and All-Section selection.

College career
Williams accepted a football scholarship from Western Illinois University where he majored in Exercise science. As a redshirt freshman in 2005, he played in 10 out of 11 games, making 23 tackles (14 solo), one tackle for loss and one blocked kick. He started the final two games of the season at strong safety. 

As a sophomore in 2006, he started all 11 games at weakside linebacker. He recorded 92 tackles, 3 sacks, 10.5 tackles for loss (led the team), 3 forced fumbles, one interception. He also earned honorable-mention All-Gateway Conference and earned the team’s Green Beret award for his significant contributions to the kicking game. He had 15 tackles against Illinois State University.

As a junior in 2007, Williams recorded 107 tackles (third in the conference), 8 sacks (led the conference), 16.5 tackles for loss (led the conference), 5 forced fumbles (led the conference), 6 passes defensed. The five forced fumbles tied a school  and league record, while ranking fifth in the nation. He ranked among the nation's top 50 defensive players in tackles for loss, total tackles and sacks. He was a runner-up for the Gateway Defensive Player of the Year Award. He was named the team’s defensive MVP at the teams annual awards banquet.

As a senior in 2008, he started all 11 games at weakside linebacker, posting 67 tackles (39 solo), 4 sacks, 14.5 tackles-for-losses and led the nation with a school-record six forced fumbles. He had 2 sacks and 2 forced fumbles in a 24–28 loss against the University of Arkansas. He finished fourth in the Buck Buchanan award voting. He was also named to the Associated Press All-America First-team, the Sports Network All-America First-team and the College Sporting News All-America team. He became the first player in school history to earn repeated All-American honors, he was also named the team's Defensive MVP and played in the East-West Shrine Game.

Williams ended his college career by setting a FCS record and tied the NCAA all-division record of 14 career forced fumbles. He recorded a career total of 289 tackles, 15.0 sacks (10th in school history), 45 tackles-for-loss (seventh in school history), 14 forced fumbles (tied NCAA record), 12 pass breakups, one interception, two fumble recoveries, and one blocked kick while starting 35-of-43 games.

Professional career

Pre-draft
Williams was not invited to participate at the 2009 NFL Scouting Combine, however he did take part in Northwestern University's Pro Day.

Dallas Cowboys
The Dallas Cowboys started the 2009 NFL Draft without a first-round draft choice (part of the price to acquire Roy Williams) and then traded out of the second round, after they couldn't draft center Max Unger. After posting great pre-draft numbers, the Cowboys surprised observers by selecting Williams in the third round (69th overall). He was inactive for 11 games (3 with a sprained left ankle) and played in only five, making 2 special teams tackles.

In 2010, during a 1–7 start, the Cowboys declared him inactive for two games because of poor play, before releasing him on November 2, based on his inability to grasp the defense and a lack of consistency on special teams. He appeared in 5 games, registering 3 defensive tackles, one pass defensed and 6 special teams tackles.

Carolina Panthers (first stint)
On November 3, 2010, Williams was claimed off waivers by the Carolina Panthers. He collected 5 tackles, a fumble recovery and two passes defensed in two games as a starter at weak-side linebacker. He was placed on the injured reserve with a torn ACL on December 13. He finished with 15 defensive tackles, one pass defensed and 3 special teams tackles.

In 2011, he played in 14 games (2 declared inactive) and started 2 contests at weakside linebacker. He had 21 defensive tackles, one forced fumble and 15 special teams tackles (led the team). He was released during final cuts on August 31, 2012.

Philadelphia Eagles
On October 9, 2012, he was signed by the Philadelphia Eagles. On November 3, he was released after playing in 2 games.

Carolina Panthers (second stint)
On November 5, 2012, he was claimed off waivers by the Carolina Panthers. He played in 5 games (3 inactive) and registered 5 special teams tackles.

On August 31, 2013, he was released before the start of the season. On October 16, the Panthers re-signed him to take over Chase Blackburn's special teams duties, after he was named the starter at weakside linebacker. He blocked a punt against the New York Jets. He appeared in 11 games and tallied 5 special teams tackles. 

In 2014, he appeared in 11 games (declared inactive in one contest), while making one defensive tackle and 3 special teams tackles. He was released on December 2.

Tampa Bay Buccaneers
On December 8, 2014, he was signed as free agent by the Tampa Bay Buccaneers, after linebacker Brandon Magee was placed on the injured reserve list. He played in three games, collecting 3 defensive tackles and 4 special teams tackles. 

Williams was re-signed on March 7, 2015. He was released on September 6, after the team claimed linebackers Jeremiah George and James-Michael Johnson.

References

External links
 Western Illinois Leathernecks bio

1986 births
Living people
Players of American football from Chicago
American football linebackers
Western Illinois Leathernecks football players
Dallas Cowboys players
Carolina Panthers players
Philadelphia Eagles players
Tampa Bay Buccaneers players